Dow Lohnes PLLC was an AmLaw 200 American law firm headquartered in Washington, D.C., founded as Dow, Lohnes & Albertson in 1918. 

In 1928, Fayette B. Dow encouraged his partner Horace Lohnes to investigate the regulation of radio transmitters under the newly-established Federal Radio Commission, and the potential to develop a clientele engaged in broadcasting.

Fred W. Anderson represented FM radio pioneer Edwin Armstrong, as well as Douglas Fairbanks and Mary Pickford. He and Lohnes built the firm's practice of representing companies with interests in both television and radio.

By 1990 the firm had 200 lawyers. 

Dow Lohnes Sports and Entertainment LLC was established in 2003 as a division within Dow Lohnes PLLC.

In January 2014, Dow Lohnes merged with Cooley LLP.

Offices

Atlanta
Norman, Oklahoma
Washington, D.C.

Notable partners and employees
 Fayette B. Dow – founding member, former general counsel of the National Petroleum Association, Western Petroleum Refiners Association, and American Petroleum Institute.
 Horace L. Lohnes – founding member.
 Fred W. Albertson - founding member.
 Bernard Long – former member, former Assistant U.S. Attorney in Washington, D.C. and Principal Attorney in the Office of Chief Counsel of the Bureau of Internal Revenue (now Internal Revenue Service).

References

External links
Dow Lohnes website

Law firms based in Washington, D.C.
Law firms established in 1918
Defunct law firms of the United States
Law firms disestablished in 2014